Bushy-crested may refer to:

 Bushy-crested hornbill, a species of hornbill in the family Bucerotidae
 Bushy-crested jay, a species of bird in the family Corvidae